At the 1996 Summer Olympics, two different gymnastics disciplines were contested: artistic gymnastics and rhythmic gymnastics.  The artistic gymnastics events were held at the Georgia Dome from July 20–25 and July 28–29.  The rhythmic gymnastics events were held at Stegeman Coliseum in nearby Athens, on the campus of the University of Georgia from August 1–4.

The women's rhythmic group all-around was contested for the first time at these Games. This marked the second time that a women's only sport was introduced to the Games.

Artistic gymnastics

Format of competition
The gymnastics competition at the 1996 Summer Olympics was carried out in three stages:

Competition I - The team competition/qualification round in which gymnasts, including those who were not part of a team, performed both compulsory and optional exercises. Six of the seven team members performed on each apparatus, while only the five highest scores during each rotation were used to determine the overall team total.  The thirty-six highest scoring gymnasts in the all-around qualified to the individual all-around competition. The eight highest-scoring gymnasts on each apparatus qualified to the final for that apparatus.
Competition II - The individual all-around competition, in which those who qualified from Competition I performed exercises on each apparatus.  The final score of each gymnast was determined by adding the scores earned by him or her on each of the six apparatuses in the men's competition and each of the four apparatuses in the women's competition.
Competition III - The apparatus finals, in which those who qualified during Competition I performed an exercise on the individual apparatus on which he or she had qualified.  The final score of each gymnast determined by the score earned by him or her on the apparatus during this competition.

Each country was limited to three gymnasts in the all-around final and two gymnasts in each apparatus final.

Men's events

Women's events

Rhythmic gymnastics

Medal table

See also
Gymnastics at the 1994 Asian Games
Gymnastics at the 1994 Commonwealth Games
Gymnastics at the 1995 Pan American Games
1995 World Artistic Gymnastics Championships

References

External links
Official Olympic Report
www.gymnasticsresults.com

 
1996 Summer Olympics events
Olympic
1996
Sports in Athens, Georgia